Christopher Carlos Jones (born December 16, 1965) is an American former professional baseball outfielder. Jones made his Major League Baseball debut with the Cincinnati Reds on April 21, 1991 and appeared in his final game with the Milwaukee Brewers on July 29, 2000.

Career
He graduated in 1984 from Liverpool High School located in Liverpool suburb of Syracuse, New York. He was drafted by the Cincinnati Reds in the 3rd round of the 1984 Major League Baseball Draft, and spent the next six seasons in the Reds' farm system. He played in 52 games in his rookie year before being released by the Reds and signed by the Houston Astros.

After a season with Houston, Jones was a member of the inaugural Colorado Rockies team that began play in Major League Baseball in 1993, and spent two years with the team, as well as two years with the New York Mets. He spent 1997 with the San Diego Padres then played for the inaugural Arizona Diamondbacks team in 1998. After playing for the San Francisco Giants and Milwaukee Brewers, he played in the minor leagues until 2004.

In 2004 Jones signed to play for the Newark Bears of the independent Atlantic League, following his retirement he returned to manage the Bears for two seasons from 2005-06. the team went 100-165 during his time in Newark. In January 2007, he took over as manager of the Kannapolis Intimidators, a minor league affiliate of the Chicago White Sox.

Jones currently lives now in Phoenix, Arizona, with his wife, Cystal, and two children, Christopher and Crishana.

References

External links

Pura Pelota (Venezuelan League)
Retrosheet

1965 births
Living people
African-American baseball players
Águilas del Zulia players
American expatriate baseball players in Mexico
Arizona Diamondbacks players
Baseball players from New York (state)
Billings Mustangs players
Cafeteros de Córdoba players
Cedar Rapids Reds players
Chattanooga Lookouts players
Cincinnati Reds players
Colorado Rockies players
Colorado Springs Sky Sox players
Fresno Grizzlies players
Houston Astros players
Indianapolis Indians players
Las Vegas Stars (baseball) players
Leones de Yucatán players
Major League Baseball outfielders
Mexican League baseball left fielders
Milwaukee Brewers players
Minor league baseball managers
Nashville Sounds players
New York Mets players
Newark Bears players
Norfolk Tides players
Sportspeople from Utica, New York
Richmond Braves players
San Diego Padres players
San Francisco Giants players
St. Paul Saints players
Syracuse SkyChiefs players
Tiburones de La Guaira players
American expatriate baseball players in Venezuela
Tucson Toros players
Vermont Reds players
21st-century African-American people
20th-century African-American sportspeople
Liverpool High School alumni